Liceo linguistico e scientifico "Pier Martire Vermigli" is a private Italian international liceo (upper secondary school) in Zürich, Switzerland. It is on the second and third floors of the "Casa d'Italia" facility, which also houses the Scuola statale primaria e dell'infanzia/Scuola Italiana di Zurigo, a primary school operated by the Italian government; and the Scuola media paritaria "Enrico Fermi", which is a private Italian lower secondary school.

It was founded in 1978.

Accreditation

By Swiss authorities
The Liceo linguistico e scientifico "Pietro Martire Vermigli" upper secondary education program is recognised as a Mittelschule, by the bureau for gymnasial and vocational education (Mittelschul- und Berufsbildungsamt), administration of education (Bildungsdirektion), canton of Zurich and by the Swiss Federal State Secretariat for Education, Research and Innovation (SERI).

By Italian authorities
The Italian Ministry of Foreign Affairs designates Liceo Vermigli as an overseas Italian school.

References

External links
 Liceo Vermigli
"ESAMI DI STATO AL LICEO VERMIGLI DI ZURIGO". La Pagina. 8 July 2009.
"IL LICEO VERMIGLI ALLA CASA D'ITALIA!!!". La Pagina. 1 October 2011.

Italian international schools in Switzerland
1978 establishments in Switzerland
Educational institutions established in 1978
Upper secondary schools in the Canton of Zürich
Schools in Zürich